CD-4 or CD4 may refer to:

 CD4, a cell surface molecule present on leukocytes
 CD4+ cells, a type of T cell
 Color Developing Agent 4, a developing agent for color film
 Compatible Discrete 4, a quadraphonic phonograph record format developed by JVC
 Ford CD4 platform